Juan Ignacio Martínez Jiménez (born 23 June 1964), is a Spanish football coach and former player, who played as a left back, and is a current head coach.

Playing career
Martínez was born in Alicante. After playing youth football for both Alicante CF and Elche CF he competed only at amateur level during his career, never in higher than the third division. He played for Elche CF Ilicitano, CD Benicarló, UD Melilla – due to his compulsory military service – Alicante, UD Vall de Uxó, UD Almansa and FC Torrevieja.

Martínez ended his career in 1990, at only 26.

Coaching career

Martínez began managing in 1997, his first stop being precisely Alicante. In the following years, he coached several teams in the lower leagues – also working in youth and women's football – his longest spell being three years with AD Mar Menor-San Javier in the fourth level, which he led to two consecutive playoff appearances albeit without any promotion.

In the 2005–06 season, Martínez led FC Cartagena to the first position in division three. He first reached the professionals in the 2007–08 campaign, coaching UD Salamanca to a final seventh place in the second tier.

After another season in the second division, with Albacete Balompié, Martínez returned to Cartagena (recently returned to that level). He led the Murcian club to the fifth position in his first year, and the 13th in his second.

Affectionately known as "JIM" (his full name's initials), Martínez was appointed at Levante UD on 9 June 2011, replacing Getafe CF-bound Luis García. After two draws in the first two La Liga rounds he coached the team to seven consecutive wins, including a 1–0 home victory against Real Madrid.

Martínez also led the Valencians to their first continental competition ever, by finishing sixth in 2011–12. After ranking only 11th in the following season he opted to not renew his contract, and signed a two-year deal with fellow league side Real Valladolid.

On 24 May 2014, after the latter's relegation, Martínez was relieved of his duties. On 11 December he was appointed at the helm of UD Almería, replacing fired Francisco; on 5 April 2015, he was sacked by the Andalusians after a heavy 1–4 home loss to his previous club Levante.

After one month as working as a personal assistant to Lorca FC's new Chinese owner Xu Genbao, Martínez moved abroad in November 2016 to manage Shanghai Shenxin F.C. on an annual salary of €600,000. He left a year later, having finished seventh in China League One and reached the semi-finals of the FA Cup, where they were beaten by Super League's Shanghai Greenland Shenhua FC. He remained in the country with Meizhou Meixian Techand F.C. of the same league, being dismissed in September with the team third from bottom after 24 games.

Martínez was hired by Al-Arabi SC of the Kuwaiti Premier League in June 2019, working alongside Darko Nestorović. On 14 December 2020, he returned to his home country after being named at the helm of Real Zaragoza in the second division.

Martínez left Zaragoza on 30 May 2022, after avoiding relegation.

Personal life
Martínez's cousin, José Bordalás, is also a football coach.

Managerial statistics

References

External links

1964 births
Living people
Footballers from Alicante
Spanish footballers
Association football defenders
Segunda División B players
Tercera División players
Elche CF Ilicitano footballers
UD Melilla footballers
Alicante CF footballers
CD Torrevieja players
Spanish football managers
La Liga managers
Segunda División managers
Segunda División B managers
Alicante CF managers
FC Cartagena managers
CD Alcoyano managers
UD Salamanca managers
Albacete Balompié managers
Levante UD managers
Real Valladolid managers
UD Almería managers
Real Zaragoza managers
Kuwait Premier League managers
Al-Arabi SC (Kuwait) managers
Spanish expatriate football managers
Expatriate football managers in China
Expatriate football managers in Kuwait
Spanish expatriate sportspeople in China
Spanish expatriate sportspeople in Kuwait